Andrew Hancock Sudduth (November 21, 1961 – July 15, 2006) was one of the best United States rowers of his generation. He was a fixture on the United States national team throughout the 1980s.

In 1981, Sudduth first represented the United States at the Under 23 World Championships in the men's eight (8+) which finished second.  Later that year, he again represented the United States in the World Rowing Championships, where his four-man boat (4+) finished second.  Sudduth would go on to represent the United States in the four (4+) at the 1982 and 1983 World Championships, where his boat finished third and seventh, respectively.

After high school, Sudduth had enrolled at Harvard.  However, Sudduth was a prankster and ran into disciplinary problems resulting in his suspension from school.  Although quite upset at the time, Sudduth later acknowledged that this incident helped him gain focus on both his academic and athletic life.

Following his initial World Championship medal in 1981, Sudduth returned to Harvard to row and study.  Sudduth's 1983 Harvard boat, coached by Harry Parker, won the National Collegiate Rowing Championship coming from a boat length down in the last 500 meters of the race to nip the University of Washington at the finish line.  Sudduth then took a year off from school to train for the Olympics.

At the 1984 Summer Olympics, Sudduth was part of the United States men's eight which finished second to Canada.

In 1985, Sudduth returned to Harvard, where he led his crew to another National Championship, and then to the Henley Royal Regatta, where they won the Grand Challenge Cup, which is the regatta's international elite race for eights.  This is the last time that the Grand Challenge Cup was won by a United States' collegiate team.

That summer, Sudduth would represent the United States in the single scull (1x) at the 1985 World Championships.  Sudduth led the race by half a length (approximately one second) over the three-time Olympic champion Pertti Karppinen with 200 meters to go.  Just then, Sudduth's oar was knocked out of his hand by a small wave and in one stroke, he lost his advantage over Karppinen.  Karppinen, who was famous for his finishing sprint, pushed through for a one length victory over Sudduth.  Trailing well back in third place was the five-time world champion and three-time Olympic Silver medalist Peter-Michael Kolbe.

Sudduth led the United States to a bronze medal at the 1986 World Championships in the men's eight and a gold medal at the 1986 Goodwill Games.  In 1987, he returned to the single scull, finishing seventh at the World Championships.  And in 1988, Sudduth finished sixth at the Seoul Olympics.

Sudduth was also an electrical engineer and in 1988, he was the first to notify the world of the release of the Morris worm.

He died from pancreatic cancer. USRowing posthumously bestowed the Jack Kelly Award on Sudduth, which is given to outstanding rowers who represent the ideals that Jack Kelly exemplified including superior achievement in rowing, service to amateur athletics and success in their chose profession.

Achievements

Collegiate
  United States National Collegiate Rowing Championship, First Place, 1983, 1985

Indoor Rowing
  1985, CRASH-B Sprints World Champion
  1987, CRASH-B Sprints World Champion
  1988, CRASH-B Sprints World Champion

Goodwill Games
  1986, First Place, Men's Eight
  1990, Fourth Place, Men's Quadrupule Scull
  1990, Eighth Place, Men's Double Scull

World Rowing Under 23 Championships
  1981, Second Place, Men's Eight

World Rowing Championships
  1981, Second Place, Men's Four with Coxswain
  1982, Third Place, Men's Four with Coxswain
  1983, Seventh Place, Men's Four with Coxswain
  1985, Second Place, Men's Single Scull
  1986, Third Place, Men's Eight
  1987, Seventh Place, Men's Single Scull

Olympics
  1984 Summer Olympics, Silver, Men's Eight
  1988 Summer Olympics, Sixth Place, Men's Single Scull

References

External links
 Sudduth's official site (via archive.org)
 

1961 births
2006 deaths
Harvard Crimson rowers
Rowers at the 1984 Summer Olympics
Rowers at the 1988 Summer Olympics
Olympic silver medalists for the United States in rowing
Phillips Exeter Academy alumni
People from Exeter, New Hampshire
Deaths from pancreatic cancer
American male rowers
World Rowing Championships medalists for the United States
Medalists at the 1984 Summer Olympics
Goodwill Games medalists in rowing
Competitors at the 1986 Goodwill Games
Sportspeople from Rockingham County, New Hampshire